Erodium astragaloides is a species of flowering plant in the geranium family Geraniaceae. It is endemic to Sierra Nevada, southern Spain.

Habitat
The distinctive species can grow in sparse grasslands on less developed rocky-sandy dolomitic soils. It is associated with Juniperus phoenicea, as a part of communities which are rich at endemic species, such as Rothmaleria granatensis, Helianthemum pannosum, Silene boryi, Convolvulus boissieri, Anthyllis tejedensis, Thymus granatensis, and Saxifraga erioblasta.

References

astragaloides
Endemic flora of Spain
Endemic flora of the Iberian Peninsula
Plants described in 1852
Taxa named by Pierre Edmond Boissier
Taxa named by George François Reuter